Ron Farmer is the name of:

Ron Farmer (footballer) (1936–2022), footballer from Guernsey
Ron Farmer (motorsport)